Auxesis gabonicus is a species of beetle in the family Cerambycidae. It was described by Thomson in 1858. It is known from Gabon, the Democratic Republic of the Congo, Angola, the Republic of the Congo, and the Ivory Coast.

References

Xystrocerini
Beetles described in 1858